A dos Cunhados e Maceira is a civil parish in the municipality of Torres Vedras, Portugal. It was formed in 2013 by the merger of the former parishes A dos Cunhados and Maceira. The population in 2011 was 10,391, in an area of 52.72 km².

References

Freguesias of Torres Vedras